Michal Hipp (born 13 March 1963) is a former Slovak footballer and manager, currently managing Haladás Szomabthely .

Hipp began his football career in his native village Horná Kráľová. When he was twelve years old, he started playing in the youth team and then progressed to the first team when he was sixteen. In 1983 Hipp got an offer to transfer to Slovan Duslo Šaľa by coach Jozef Adamec. There he played as a right midfielder. Then he left for MŠK Hurbanovo as he completed compulsory military service in the town.

In October 1984 he went to Plastika Nitra. Hipp debuted in the Czechoslovak First League in the 1986–87 season in a match against FC Bohemians Praha. In 1989–90 season FC Nitra qualified for the UEFA Cup. They lost both matches against 1. FC Köln with an aggregate score of 5–1.

Also he played for Czech side Slavia Prague and 1. FC Košice.

References

External links
Michal Hipp at The Football Association of the Czech Republic

1963 births
Living people
People from Šaľa District
Sportspeople from the Nitra Region
Slovak footballers
Slovak football managers
Slovakia international footballers
Czechoslovak footballers
Czechoslovak expatriate footballers
Czechoslovakia international footballers
Dual internationalists (football)
Association football defenders
FC Nitra players
Czech First League players
SK Slavia Prague players
FC VSS Košice players
First Vienna FC players
FK Slovan Duslo Šaľa players
Slovak Super Liga players
Expatriate footballers in Austria
Czechoslovak expatriate sportspeople in Austria
ŠK Slovan Bratislava managers
FC Petržalka managers
FC Nitra managers
Slovakia national football team managers
FC Vysočina Jihlava managers
Szombathelyi Haladás football managers
Nemzeti Bajnokság I managers
Czech First League managers
Expatriate football managers in Hungary
Expatriate football managers in the Czech Republic
Expatriate football managers in Kazakhstan
Slovak expatriate sportspeople in Hungary
Slovak expatriate sportspeople in the Czech Republic
Slovak expatriate sportspeople in Kazakhstan